Alana Evie Boden (born 1997) is a  English  actress. She was nominated for a Critics' Choice Award for her performance in the Lifetime film I Am Elizabeth Smart (2017).

Early life
Boden was born in Surrey and grew up in Hampshire. She has two sisters. She began her career as a child model when she was nine before moving into television commercials and short films. She was homeschooled to make time for her career.

Career
Boden made her television debut as Beatrice Selfridge in the second and third series of the ITV period drama Mr Selfridge. She won the Rising Star award at the 2016 London Short Film Festival for her performance in the drama The Earth Belongs to No One. That same year, she starred as Elaine Wiltshire in the Canadian YTV series Ride about an equestrian school in England.

In 2017, Boden played a young version of the titular person Elizabeth Smart in the Lifetime biographical film I Am Elizabeth Smart, for which Boden was nominated for Best Actress in a Television Movie or Limited Series at the following year's Critics' Choice Awards.

Boden appeared in the films Hostage Radio and Infamous Six. In 2022, she stars in Flowers in the Attic: The Origin, a Lifetime miniseries prequel based on the novel Garden of Shadows. Also that year, she appeared in the films Uncharted and The Invitation.

Filmography

Film

Television

Web

Stage

Awards and nominations

References

External links
 
 Alana Boden at Olivia Bell Management

Living people
1997 births
Actresses from Hampshire
Actresses from Surrey
British child models
English child actresses